Gien-sur-Cure is a commune in the Nièvre department in the Bourgogne-Franche-Comté region in central-east France. In 2019, it had a population of 95. Part of Morvan Regional Natural Park, Gien-sur-Cure is located on the departmental border with both Saône-et-Loire—at Anost and Cussy-en-Morvan—and Côte-d'Or—at the Ménessaire exclave.

See also
Communes of the Nièvre department
Morvan Regional Natural Park

References

Communes of Nièvre